George Granville Leveson-Gower, 1st Duke of Sutherland KG, PC (9 January 175819 July 1833), known as Viscount Trentham from 1758 to 1786, as Earl Gower from 1786 to 1803 and as the Marquess of Stafford from 1803 to 1833, was an English politician, diplomat, landowner and patron of the arts from the Leveson-Gower family. He was the wealthiest man in Britain during the latter part of his life. He remains a controversial figure for his role in the Highland Clearances.

Background
Sutherland was the eldest son of Granville Leveson-Gower, 1st Marquess of Stafford, by his second wife, Lady Louisa, daughter of Scroop Egerton, 1st Duke of Bridgwater. Granville Leveson-Gower, 1st Earl Granville, was his half-brother. He was educated at Westminster and at Christ Church, Oxford, where he graduated MA in 1777.

Earlier political career
Sutherland sat as Member of Parliament for Newcastle-under-Lyme from 1779 to 1784 and for Staffordshire from 1787 to 1799. The latter year he was summoned to the House of Lords through a writ of acceleration in his father's junior title of Baron Gower.

Ambassador during French Revolution
Between 1790 and 1792 he was Ambassador to France. Gower was appointed ambassador in Paris in June 1790 at the age of 32. Due to Louis XVI being under house arrest in the Tuileries Palace, Gower was unable to become 'an ornament at Versailles', i.e. was unable to work closely with the royal family. Gower was scarcely better equipped to handle the complexity of the French Revolution than his predecessor, the Duke of Dorset. He had no previous experience of diplomacy. Gower's main priority in Paris was to provide news from the French court back to Britain, however trivial. Though Gower also reported some popular 'disturbances', he had little comprehension of the broader political climate. On 10 August 1792 an insurrection by the newly established Paris Revolutionary Commune drove the royal family from the Tuileries and three days later Louis was arrested and imprisoned in the Temple fortress. Britain broke off diplomatic relations in protest. The closure of the British embassy meant that the intelligence operations could no longer be run from it, resulting in Britain replacing the ambassador with Captain George Monro, removing Gower from diplomacy in France.

Later political career
After his return to Britain he declined the posts of Lord Steward of the Household and Lord-Lieutenant of Ireland. However, in 1799 he accepted the office of joint Postmaster General, which he retained until 1801. Sutherland played an important part in the downfall of Henry Addington's administration in 1804, after which he changed political allegiance from the Tory to the Whig party. After 1807 he played little part in politics, although late in life he supported Catholic Emancipation and the 1832 Reform Act.

From 1794 to 1801, Sutherland was Colonel of the Staffordshire Volunteer Cavalry, an early form of yeomanry regiment. Sutherland also held the honorary posts of Lord Lieutenant of Staffordshire from 1799 to 1801 and Lord Lieutenant of Sutherland from 1794 to 1830. He was invested as a Privy Counsellor in 1790, a Knight of the Garter in 1806 and was created Duke of Sutherland on 28 January 1833.

In 1831, the then Marquess of Stafford served the annual post of treasurer of the Salop Infirmary in Shrewsbury.

Wealth
The Leveson-Gower family owned extensive lands in Staffordshire, Shropshire and Yorkshire. In 1803 Sutherland also succeeded to the vast estates of his maternal uncle Francis Egerton, 3rd Duke of Bridgewater, which included the Bridgewater Canal and a major art collection including much of the Orleans Collection; both Gower and his uncle had been members of the consortium which brought it to London for dispersal. According to the will of the Duke of Bridgewater, these passed on the death of the first Duke of Sutherland to his third son Lord Francis Leveson-Gower (see below). This inheritance brought him great wealth. Sutherland is estimated to have been the wealthiest man of the 19th-century, surpassing even Nathan Rothschild. The precise value of his estate at death is unknown, as it was simply classed as 'upper value'. He was described by Charles Greville as a "leviathan of wealth" and "...the richest individual who ever died". Following the death of the Duke of York in 1827 he purchased the leasehold of Stafford House (now Lancaster House), which became the London residence of the dukes of Sutherland until 1912.

Development of Sutherland and Highland clearances
Sutherland and his wife remain controversial figures for their role in carrying out the Highland Clearances, where thousands of tenants were evicted and rehoused in coastal crofts as part of a program of improvement. The larger clearances in Sutherland were undertaken between 1811 and 1820. In 1811 Parliament passed an Act granting half the expenses of building roads in northern Scotland, on the provision that landowners paid for the other half. The following year Sutherland commenced building roads and bridges in the county, which up to that point had been virtually non-existent. Appalled by the poor living conditions of his tenants and influenced by social and economic theories of the day as well as consulting widely on the subject, he and his wife (to whom much of the proprietorial oversight of the estate had been delegated) became convinced that subsistence farming in the interior of Sutherland could not be sustained in the long-term. Much higher rents could be obtained from letting land for extensive sheep farms – so providing a much better income from the estate.

The Sutherland estate management had had plans for clearance for some years, with some clearance activity in 1772 when Lady Sutherland was still a child. However, a shortage of money stopped these plans from progressing to any greater degree – a situation that continued after her marriage to Leveson-Gower. However, when he inherited the vast wealth of the Duke of Bridgewater, plans could proceed – and Leveson-Gower was happy for large amounts of his wealth to be spent on the changes to the Sutherland estate. Though unusual for the time, much of the oversight of the estate management was delegated to Lady Sutherland, who took a keen interest in the estate, travelling to Dunrobin Castle most summers and engaging in a continuous exchange of correspondence with the factor and James Loch, the Stafford estate commissioner.

The first of the new wave of clearances involved relocations from Assynt to coastal villages with the plan that farmers could take up fishing. The next eviction, in the Strath of Kildonan in 1813, was met with opposition and a six week long confrontation that was resolved by calling out the army and the estate making some concessions to those who were evicted. In 1814, one of the estate's factors, Patrick Sellar, was supervising clearances in Strathnaver when the roof timbers of a house were set on fire (to prevent the house being reoccupied after the eviction) with, allegedly, an elderly and bedridden woman still inside. The woman was rescued, but died six days later. The local law officer, Robert Mackid, was an enemy of Sellar and started taking witness statements so that Sellar could be prosecuted. The case went to trial in 1816 and Sellar was acquitted. The publicity arising from the trial was not welcome to the Sutherlands. Sellar was replaced as factor and further, larger clearances continued in 1818 to 1820. Despite efforts to avoid press comment, in 1819 The Observer newspaper ran the headline: "the Devastation of Sutherland", reporting the burning of roof timbers of large numbers of houses cleared at the same time.

Monuments

In 1837 a large monument, known locally as the Mannie, was erected on Ben Bhraggie near Golspie to commemorate the Duke's life. The existence of this statue has been the subject of some controversy—in 1994, Sandy Lindsay, a former Scottish National Party councillor from Inverness proposed its demolition. He later altered his plan, asking permission from the local council to relocate the statue and replace it with plaques telling the story of the Clearances. Lindsay proposed moving the statue to the grounds of Dunrobin Castle, after the J. Paul Getty Museum in Los Angeles declined his offer to take it. There was a failed attempt by vandals to topple the statue in November 2011. A BBC news report of this incident quoted a local person saying that few people wished the statue removed; instead they saw it as an important reminder of history. , however, the statue still stands. 

There is also a monument to Leveson-Gower in Shropshire. The Lilleshall Monument, built in 1833, is a 70-foot (21 m) high obelisk, a local landmark visible for some distance around which stands on top of Lilleshall Hill, within the original estates of the Leveson family acquired on the dissolution of Lilleshall Abbey. The tablet on the north face of the monument reads "To the memory of George Granville Leveson Gower, K.G. 1st Duke of Sutherland. The most just and generous of landlords. This monument is erected by the occupiers of his Grace's Shropshire farms as a public testimony that he went down to his grave with the blessings of his tenants on his head and left behind him upon his estates the best inheritance which a gentleman of England can bequeath to his son; men ready to stand by his house, heart and hand."

There is also a monument erected in the Trentham Gardens Estate, Trentham, Staffordshire.

Family
Sutherland married Elizabeth Sutherland, 19th Countess of Sutherland, daughter of William Sutherland, 18th Earl of Sutherland and the former Mary Maxwell, on 4 September 1785. They had four surviving children:

George Sutherland-Leveson-Gower, 2nd Duke of Sutherland,(11 Aug 1786–1861)
Lady Charlotte Sophia Leveson-Gower (c. 1788–1870), married Henry Fitzalan-Howard, 13th Duke of Norfolk and had issue.
Lady Elizabeth Mary Leveson-Gower (1797–1891), married Richard Grosvenor, 2nd Marquess of Westminster and had issue.
Francis Leveson-Gower (later Egerton) 1st Earl of Ellesmere, (1800–1857)

Eleven years after becoming enfeebled by a paralytic stroke, Sutherland died at Dunrobin Castle in July 1833, aged 75, and was buried at Dornoch Cathedral. He was succeeded by his eldest son, George. The Duchess of Sutherland died in January 1839, aged 73, and was also succeeded by her eldest son, George.

The Bridgewater Estate was passed in trust in accordance with the Duke of Bridgewater's will, to the Duke's third son Francis.

Ancestry

Legacy
Due to his controversial role in the Sutherland Clearances, the "Mannie" statue to the Duke in Golspie, Sutherland has been subject to repeated vandalism.

There are several well-known Gaelic songs mocking the duke personally.

References

External links

1758 births
1833 deaths
People educated at Westminster School, London
Alumni of Christ Church, Oxford
British MPs 1774–1780
British MPs 1780–1784
British MPs 1784–1790
British MPs 1790–1796
British MPs 1796–1800
Diplomatic peers
Dukes of Sutherland
Highland Clearances
George Leveson-Gower, 1st Duke of Sutherland
Knights of the Garter
Lord-Lieutenants of Staffordshire
Lord-Lieutenants of Sutherland
Staffordshire Yeomanry officers
Members of the Privy Council of Great Britain
Members of the Parliament of Great Britain for Newcastle-under-Lyme 
Ambassadors of Great Britain to France
United Kingdom Postmasters General
Marquesses of Stafford
Peers of the United Kingdom created by William IV